Alfred Mann may refer to:

Alfred E. Mann (1925–2016), American entrepreneur and philanthropist
Alfred Mann (musicologist) (1917–2006), academic and writer in musical theory
Alfred K. Mann (1920–2013), particle physicist